Shanghai Rail Transit includes all rail transit lines operating in Shanghai, mainly composed of High-volume railway system, Low-to-medium-volume railway system and Maglev system. The system was established on May 28, 1993, when Shanghai Metro Line 1 opened.

Overview 
The Shanghai Metro is the biggest component of the Shanghai metropolitan rail transit network, together with the Shanghai maglev train, the Zhangjiang Tram, the Songjiang Tram, and the commuter rail Jinshan railway operated by China Railway Shanghai Group.

High-volume railway system

Shanghai Metro

Shanghai Metro was opened on May 28, 1993 and is one of the busiest urban rail transit systems in the world, providing public transport services to 14 municipal districts in Shanghai and Kunshan City in Jiangsu Province. Except the Shanghai maglev train and the Pujiang Line, the other seventeen lines (737 km) of the Shanghai Metro are all heavy rails. These lines are operated by Shanghai Shentong Metro Group Co., Ltd., except the Huaqiao section of Line 11, which is operated by Kunshan Rail Transit Co., Ltd. The daily operating hours of Shanghai Metro are approximately from 5:00 to 24:00.

Rubber-tyred system
Pujiang Line was opened on March 31, 2018, with a total length of 6.69 km and 6 stations. It is operated by Shanghai Keolis, with daily service hours from 5:40 to 22:30.

Shanghai Metropolitan Area Intercity Railway

Shanghai Metropolitan Area Intercity Railway currently consists only of the Jinshan Railway, also known as Jinshan Line, opened on September 28, 2012, passing through Xuhui, Minhang, Songjiang, and Jinshan districts of Shanghai, with a total length of 56.4 km and 8 stations. This line is operated by the China Railway Shanghai Group. The daily operating time is from 6:00 to 21:55. On weekdays, there is another direct train from Shanghai South Station at 5:30. It takes 32 to 60 minutes from the starting station, Jinshanwei Station, to the final station, Shanghai South Station, depending on the number of stops on the way. The starting fare is 3 yuan, and the full fare is 10 yuan. Jinshan Line is one of the Shanghai suburban railway lines. In addition to paper tickets, passengers can also use Shanghai Public Transport Card, near-field communication (NFC), and mobile phone boarding code to enter the station. The transfer discount policy for Shanghai public transport service is applicable in this line.
Two further lines are under construction, namely the Airport Link line and Jiamin line.

Low-to-medium-volume railway system

Zhangjiang Tram
Zhangjiang Tram was opened on December 31, 2009. The whole line is located in Shanghai’s Pudong New Area. It is about 10 km long and has 15 stations. Zhangjiang tram adopts the French Translohr tram system, with low floor, monorail guidance, rubber wheels, three carriages, and a maximum capacity of about 167 passengers. TEDA Modern Guided Rail Tram in Tianjin uses the same transit system. The line is operated by Shanghai Pudong Modern Rail Transit Co., Ltd., with daily operating hours from 5:45 to 23:00, and a full fare of 2 yuan for the whole line. The transfer discount policy for Shanghai public transport service is applicable in this line.

Songjiang Tram

Songjiang Tram was opened on December 26, 2018, passing through the Songjiang and Minhang districts of Shanghai. It has two lines operated by Shanghai Songjiang Tram Investment Operation Co., Ltd., and Shanghai Keolis, with a total length of about 30 km. Songjiang tram uses the French Alstom Citadis 302 tramcar, with five carriages and a maximum capacity of about 300 passengers. Chengdu Tram Line 2 uses the same vehicle model. The fare for 10 km or less is 2 yuan. For more than 10 km, the fare increases by 1 yuan for every 10 km. The transfer discount policy for Shanghai public transport service is applicable in this line.

Shanghai Pudong Airport APM

Shanghai Pudong Airport APM is a People Mover opened on September 16, 2019, using A-type metro train system with four cars, runs inside Shanghai Pudong International Airport, including the East Line and the West Line. The operating section of the East Line is 1.65 km long, connecting Terminal 2 and Satellite 2, and the operating section of the West Line is 1.86 km long, connecting Terminal 1 and Satellite 1. Shanghai Keolis operates this transit system.

Maglev system

Shanghai Maglev Line was opened on December 31, 2002, with a total length of 30.5 km and two stations. It is operated by Shanghai Maglev Transportation Development Co., Ltd., and its daily service hours are from 6:40 to 21:42. Except for the 15-minute interval between the first two trains from  Station, the interval for other trains is 20 minutes. An ordinary one-way ticket is 50 yuan, and the passenger holding an air ticket or Shanghai Public Transport Card can enjoy a 20% discount (40 yuan).

See also

Notes

References

1993 establishments in China
Maglev
Monorails in China
Rail transport in Shanghai
Shanghai Metro
Tram transport in China